Estádio Leônidas Sodré de Castro, also known as Estádio Leônidas Castro, but usually known as Estádio da Curuzú, is a football stadium owned by Paysandu Sport Club, located in São Braz neighborhood, Belém, Pará, Brazil. The stadium has a maximum capacity of 16,200 people.

The stadium is nicknamed Estádio da Curuzú because it is located near the Curuzú street. Estádio da Curuzú is also nicknamed the Vovô da Cidade (meaning City's Grandpa) because it is the oldest stadium of Pará state.

History
Paysandu acquired the stadium from Empresa Ferreira & Comandita in July 1918, paying 12 contos de réis for it.

On July 4, 1997, one of the quickest goals in a football match was scored at Estádio da Curuzú. In the fourth second of the first half of the match, Vital Filho, of Paysandu, scored a goal against Santa Rosa  .

On December 22, 2001, at Estádio da Curuzú, Paysandu beat Avaí, of Santa Catarina state, 4-0, and won the Campeonato Brasileiro Série B, thus being promoted to the following year's first division .

On April 28, 2002, Paysandu beat São Raimundo, of Amazonas state, 3-0 at Estádio da Curuzú, winning the Copa Norte, thus gaining the right to dispute the Copa dos Campeões in the same year .

References

   FuteBOL
  Campeões do Futebol
  Paysandu goleia Avaí, fatura título e volta ao Brasileirão - Terra (December 22, 2001)
  Paysandu é campeão no Norte e impede o tetra do São Raimundo - Folha Online

External links
 Templos do Futebol
 Torcida Nação Bicolor
 Paysandu Official Website
 Campeões do Futebol
 Amapapão
World Stadiums
Sambafoot

Curuzu
Buildings and structures in Belém
Sports venues in Pará
Paysandu Sport Club